Walter Cox (1849–1925) was an English footballer and manager for Stoke.

Career
Cox was another ex-Stoke player who stepped into the manager's seat vacated by Thomas Slaney in 1883. Cox's reign however was a comparatively short one, and he was replaced by Harry Lockett after less than a year in charge. He played in and managed the club's first competitive match in the FA Cup which Stoke lost 2–1 against Manchester.

Career statistics

Player

Manager

References

External links
Stoke City managers at stokecityfc.com

1849 births
1925 deaths
English footballers
English football managers
Stoke City F.C. managers
Stoke City F.C. players
Association footballers not categorized by position